Wendy Phillips (born January 2, 1952) is an American actress, known for her roles on television series including Falcon Crest, Homefront and Promised Land.

Life and career
Phillips was born in Brooklyn, New York. She made her screen debut in the 1975 NBC Movie of the Week, Death Be Not Proud. Two years later, Phillips made her big screen debut in the drama film Fraternity Row. On television, she starred alongside Mitchell Ryan in the CBS drama series, Executive Suite from 1976 to 1977, and later on the NBC series The Eddie Capra Mysteries (1978–79). She later guest-starred on Lou Grant, Trapper John, M.D., Taxi, St. Elsewhere, The Twilight Zone, and Murder, She Wrote

During the 1980s, Phillips appeared in films Airplane II: The Sequel (1982) and Midnight Run (1988), and well as number of made-for-television movies notable Paper Dolls (1982), the NBC miniseries A Year in the Life (1986) and its sequel series from 1987 to 1988. In 1989, she was a regular cast member in the ABC sitcom The Robert Guillaume Show, and from 1989 to 1990 starred as David Selby's character's last wife, Lauren Daniels, during the final season of CBS prime time soap opera, Falcon Crest. In 1991, she played title character' ex-wife in the biographical film Bugsy.

From 1991 to 1993, Phillips starred in the ABC award-winning drama series, Homefront. She later played Gerald McRaney's wife, Claire Greene, on the CBS series Touched by an Angel (1994–98) and Promised Land (1996-99). The following years, Phillips guest-starred on Charmed, ER, The Closer, Shameless, and had a recurring roles on Studio 60 on the Sunset Strip (2006) and Big Love (2006-2011).

Phillips has been teaching Scene Study and Acting for the Camera privately since 2001, and in later years she has been an Adjunct Professor at the USC School of Cinematic Arts.

Filmography

Film

Television

References

External links
 
 

Actresses from New York City
American film actresses
American television actresses
Living people
People from Brooklyn
20th-century American actresses
21st-century American actresses
1952 births